Governors Island is a Canadian island located in Hillsborough Bay, a sub-basin of the Northumberland Strait along the south shore of Prince Edward Island.

During World War Two, attempts were made to drill for oil to fuel the war effort, though none was found. Privately owned, the island had a small airstrip developed during the 1960s but has since fallen into disuse.

External links
 Governors Island real estate description

Geography of Queens County, Prince Edward Island
Islands of Prince Edward Island
Private islands of Canada